José Félix Estigarribia Insaurralde (February 21, 1888 in Caraguatay – September 7, 1940 in Altos) was a Paraguayan military officer, politician and president. He was Commander in Chief of the Paraguayan Army during the Chaco War (1932-1935), and later served as President of Paraguay from August 15, 1939, until his death in a plane crash on September 7, 1940.

He is known for being one of the military officers of the Paraguayan Army who led Paraguay to victory in the Chaco War against Bolivia, having been an excellent military strategist during the conflict and becoming a war hero, being posthumously promoted to the rank of Field Marshal by Decree-Law No. 2984 of the Government of Higinio Morínigo, in date September 7, 1940.

Early life
Estigarribia was of humble origin, the son of a peasant and silversmith, Mateo Estigarribia, and Casilda Insaurralde. He was born in the rural town of San Roque near Santa Elena, Cordillera Department, Paraguay. He went to the elementary school of his hometown and in 1908, he went to study at Trinity College of Agriculture. However, after he had obtained his diploma, Estigarribia switched careers and in 1910 joined the army with the rank of lieutenant of infantry.

Early career
Educated as an agronomist, he joined the National Army in 1910 and spent time in Chile and in Saint Cyr's military academy in France for additional training. He commanded the First Infantry Division during the Chaco War and was promoted successively to brigadier, division general, and commander-in-chief of the armed forces. In 1935, he made a victorious return to Asunción as "Hero of the Chaco War" and was awarded a lifetime pension of 1,000 gold pesos a month. He was dismissed from the position of armed forces chief after President Eusebio Ayala was overthrown in the Febrerista Revolution by Rafael Franco, but served as Paraguay's ambassador to the United States.

He completed courses in Chile, from 1911 to 1913, the Military School of Bernardo O'Higgins. In 1917 he was promoted to captain. Played an important role in the revolution of 1922 in Paraguay and was later promoted to Major. For their skills was selected to attend the course staff, three-year at the École Supérieure de Guerre at Paris, where he was a disciple of General Maurice Gamelin and Marshal Foch. Estigarribia graduated there with top notes. On his return in 1928 was appointed Chief of Staff of the Army. Less than a year after being named was removed from office because of disagreements with the government regarding the strategy for defending the Chaco, "The Chaco should be advocated abandoning it," he argued, that is, the point was not occupy the land but to destroy the enemy. However, as the war against Bolivia seemed inevitable, the government decided that Lieutenant Colonel Estigarribia was the man who was needed in the Chaco. He was then 44 years. Small of stature, so peaceful, introspective, or his personality or his austere uniform of campaign-whose sleeves were invariably short-set him apart from the rest of the officers.

Chaco War
The definition of the Chaco War would be a war of communications in which the handling of space and time would be essential. He was determined for the Paraguayan government to accept its general mobilization plan and the beginning of the first offensive surprise Paraguay (September-December 1932) before Bolivia could mobilize its resources.

As commander-in-chief of the army and the conductor of operations, Estigarribia had a brilliant participation in the Chaco War (1932-1935). His strategy and tactics have since attracted the interest and the study of military academies around the world. He managed to stop the Bolivian advance towards the Paraguay River and destroyed powerful enemy divisions by flexibly using positional combat and guerrilla warfare techniques.

Since the army was under his command, Paraguay's maximum effort clearly led a successful military campaign against the Bolivian army, superior in men and resources, making back to the Rio Parapiti. His strategic thinking about the war of movement, the importance of logistics (especially water), concentration of forces surprise, the passage from the defensive to the offensive, and the thorough knowledge of the enemy and the terrain of operations placed him in a privileged among military drivers between the two world wars. He made the most of the officers under his command and was believed to exhibit the combative and moral virtues of a Paraguayan soldier.

He directed the Paraguayan Army during the first year of war with the rank of colonel. He was promoted to general after the victory of Campo Grande and Pozo Favorite. In recognition of services rendered to the defending the Chaco, he was promoted to the rank of marshal after his death in 1940.

Postwar
Estigarribia was elected president for a four-year term in 1939 and assumed office on August 15. Six months later on February 19, 1940, Estigarribia dissolved the legislature and suspended the Constitution. Declaring that "our nation is on the edge of horrible anarchy," he announced that democracy would be restored as soon as a workable constitutional framework could be designed. 

It turned out to be an empty promise; within five months, he recast the constitution into a severely authoritarian document. The president was vested with sweeping powers to act for what he deemed to be the good of the state, while the legislature's powers were significantly curtailed. The constitution, approved in an August referendum, effectively transformed Estigarribia's presidency into a legal dictatorship.

On September 7, 1940, Estigarribia and his wife, First Lady Julia Miranda Cueto, were on a tour of the Paraguayan interior.  On a trip from Altos to his country residence in San Bernardinos, his plane crashed in Agapuey and all on board were killed. Estigarribia was succeeded by Higinio Morínigo and was posthumously promoted to the rank of marshal. His authoritarian constitution would remain in effect until 1967, when it was replaced with an equally authoritarian document that remained in effect until 1992.

References

External links

 Biography (Presidency of the Republic of Paraguay)
 Jose Felix Estigarribia
 

1888 births
1940 deaths
People from Caraguatay, Paraguay
Paraguayan people of Basque descent
Liberal Party (Paraguay) politicians
Presidents of Paraguay
Ambassadors of Paraguay to the United States
Paraguay–United States relations
Paraguayan generals
École Spéciale Militaire de Saint-Cyr alumni
Paraguayan military personnel of the Chaco War
World War II political leaders
Victims of aviation accidents or incidents in 1940
Victims of aviation accidents or incidents in Paraguay
State leaders killed in aviation accidents or incidents